Jules-François-Paul Fauris de Saint-Vincens (1718-1798) was a French lawyer, politician, historian and numismatist.

Biography

Early life
Jules-François-Paul Fauris de Saint-Vincens was born on 21 July 1718 in Aix-en-Provence. He was baptised in the Église du Saint-Esprit in Aix. His father was Antoine de Fauris. He grew up in the Hôtel Raousset-Boulbon, a Hôtel particulier located at 14 on the Cours Mirabeau in Aix.

Career
He started serving as an Advisor to the Parliament of Aix-en-Provence from 10 October 1737. By 1746, he served as its President à mortier. He then served as Second President in 1776.

He was one of the co-founders of the Académie d'Aix-en-Provence. An aficionado of numismatics, his Table des monnaies de Provence is a very thorough summary of the coins used in Provence during the Middle Ages. His collection of old books was bequeathed to the Bibliothèque Méjanes, the public library in Aix, after his death.

Personal life
He married Julie Rossoline de Villeneuve de Vence. They had two children:
Sophie de Fauris de Noyers de Saint-Vincens (1747-1781).
Alexandre de Fauris de Saint-Vincens (1750-1815).

He died on 22 October 1798 in Aix.

Bibliography
Mémoires et observations, insérées dans le Recueil de l'académie des inscriptions
Table des monnaies de Provence
Mémoire sur les monnaies et les monuments des anciens marseillais

References

1718 births
1798 deaths
People from Aix-en-Provence
18th-century French lawyers
French politicians
Provencal nobility
French numismatists